Ledgewood is an unincorporated community located within Roxbury Township in Morris County, New Jersey. It was historically known as Drakesville after Abraham Drake, originally from Piscataway, New Jersey, who operated a mill and tavern here in the mid 1700s. The community was located on the Morris Canal.

The area is served as United States Postal Service ZIP Code 07852.

As of the 2000 United States Census, the population for ZIP Code Tabulation Area 07852 was 2,558.

Ledgewood Mall is located in Ledgewood.

Demographics

Notable people
People who were born in, residents of, or otherwise closely associated with Ledgewood include:
Jetur R. Riggs (1809–1869), represented  in the U.S. representative from 1859 to 1861.

Points of interest
King Store and Homestead
Ledgewood Historic District
Morris Canal
Silas Riggs House
Tom's Diner - The location of parts of Cyndi Lauper's Time After Time  were filmed in this now abandoned establishment

Gallery

References

External links

  curator of museums at Drakesville Historic Park
Census 2000 Fact Sheet for ZIP Code Tabulation Area 07852 from the United States Census Bureau

Roxbury Township, New Jersey
Unincorporated communities in Morris County, New Jersey
Unincorporated communities in New Jersey